William Woods (November 1790 Washington County, New York – August 7, 1837 Bath, Steuben County, New York) was an American lawyer and politician from New York.

Life
He received limited schooling, and removed to Bath in 1813. Then he studied law, was admitted to the bar and practiced in Bath. He was a member of the New York State Assembly in 1823 and 1828.

Woods was elected as an Adams-Clay Democratic-Republican to the 18th United States Congress to fill the vacancy caused by the resignation of William B. Rochester and served from December 1, 1823, to March 3, 1825. Afterwards he resumed the practice of law. He was Surrogate of Steuben County from 1827 to 1835.

He was buried at the Grove Cemetery in Bath.

References

The New York Civil List compiled by Franklin Benjamin Hough (pages 71, 200, 207, 317 and 418; Weed, Parsons and Co., 1858)

1790 births
1837 deaths
People from Washington County, New York
People from Bath, New York
Members of the New York State Assembly
New York (state) state court judges
Democratic-Republican Party members of the United States House of Representatives from New York (state)
19th-century American politicians
19th-century American judges